Enzelsberg is the name of a farmstead in the North West Province of South Africa, situated in the Marico Bushveld north of the N4 highway between Groot Marico and Zeerust.

It is also the site of a Sentech VHF repeater.

Buildings and structures in North West (South African province)